Billy Talent is the debut studio album of Canadian rock band Billy Talent, released in 2003. The band's previous album Watoosh! (1999) was released under their old name Pezz.

Commercial performance 
Billy Talent debuted at number 6 on the Canadian Albums Chart, selling 7,700 copies in its first week. The album was certified four-time platinum in Canada in January 2021. Between 1996 and 2016, Billy Talent was among the top 15 best-selling albums by Canadian bands in Canada and among the top 40 best-selling albums by Canadian artists overall in Canada.

Reception 
In 2005, Billy Talent was ranked number 453 in Rock Hard magazine's book of The 500 Greatest Rock & Metal Albums of All Time.

Tenth anniversary 
In August 2013, Billy Talent announced a Canadian tour for fall of that year entitled "A Return to the Roots", in which they played their entire first self-titled album live to celebrate its 10th anniversary. Soon after the tour, the band announced a 10th anniversary reissue of the album, released on November 26, 2013, through Warner Bros. Records, that features a bonus disc of rare demos and live recordings of the album's track list.

Track listing

Chart positions

Certifications

Personnel 
 Benjamin Kowalewicz – lead vocals
 Ian D'Sa – guitar, vocals, art direction, package design
 Jonathan Gallant – bass guitar, vocals
 Aaron Solowoniuk – drums

References 

Billy Talent albums
2003 debut albums
Atlantic Records albums
Juno Award for Album of the Year albums